is a Japanese businessman who served as the 5th president of Nintendo from September 2015 to June 2018. He was formerly the president of Nintendo of America from January 2002, succeeding Minoru Arakawa, until Reggie Fils-Aimé took his place in May 2006. He was promoted to managing director in June 2013 and was named the fifth president of the company in September 2015, succeeding Satoru Iwata, who died in July 2015. Kimishima stepped down as president in June 2018 and was succeeded by Shuntaro Furukawa.

Career

Sanwa Bank
Kimishima was born in Tokyo. After graduating from Hitotsubashi University, he joined Sanwa Bank in 1973, working there for 27 years. Kimishima dealt with corporate planning, international business development, corporate communications, and promotions. During his 27-year tenure at Sanwa Bank, Kimishima was posted in New York, New York; Los Angeles, California; and San Francisco, California in the United States, and in Central America and the Caribbean.

Pokémon
Kimishima was approached by Hiroshi Yamauchi, who wanted someone outside of the video game industry to oversee the finances of an American subsidiary for the popular Pokémon franchise. Kimishima accepted the position, and was appointed chief financial officer of The Pokémon Company in December 2000. In 2001, Kimishima was appointed president of Pokémon USA Inc. During Kimishima's early time working there, a number of popular Pokémon games were released.

Nintendo
Yamauchi appointed Tatsumi Kimishima to become president of Nintendo of America in January 2002.  He was previously working as the head of Nintendo's Pokémon division. Four years after Kimishima's promotion he was promoted again, but this time to the position of chief executive officer and chairman of the board.

President
On September 14, 2015, after the death of Iwata in July 2015, Kimishima was named company president of Nintendo. Shigeru Miyamoto and Genyo Takeda were also put into senior advisory roles as "Creative Fellow" and "Technology Fellow", respectively. Kimishima described his desire to follow Iwata's general strategy, stating that "Takeda and Miyamoto will be in charge of software development, while I control administration". In May 2016, Kimishima announced that Nintendo were going to start their own film production, and that they were looking for filmmakers for their projects. As President of Nintendo, Kimishima also oversaw the launch of the Nintendo Switch, and appeared in the 2017 Nintendo Switch Presentation. In April 2018, Nintendo announced that Kimishima would be stepping down as president on June 28, 2018, being succeeded by Shuntaro Furukawa.
Kimishima remains at Nintendo as an Executive Adviser.

References 

1950 births
Living people
Nintendo people
Japanese chief executives
Japanese chairpersons of corporations
Businesspeople from Tokyo
Hitotsubashi University alumni
Japanese video game businesspeople